Sakha Avia was an airline that operated in the Sakha Republic of Russia from 1992 until 2001.

History 

Sakha Avia was founded in 1992 after the dissolution of the Soviet Union. As Aeroflot was undergoing the upheavals brought about by the dissolution, its operations in Sakha were spun off as Yakutian Air Enterprises, and then later renamed Sakha Airlines.

The airline rebranded to Yakutia in 2002.

Fleet
The airline operated the following aircraft types before it ceased operations: 
Airbus A310
Antonov An-12 
Antonov An-24
Ilyushin Il-76M
Let L-410 Turbolet
Tupolev Tu-154M
Yakovlev Yak-40 
A number of helicopters

Destinations 
Sakha Avia till 2001 operated a number of routes: 
Barnaul - Barnaul Airport
Beijing - Beijing Capital International Airport
Blagoveshchensk - Ignatyevo Airport
Chita - Kadala Airport
Irkutsk - International Airport Irkutsk  
Khabarovsk - Khabarovsk Novy Airport
Krasnoyarsk - Krasnoyarsk Cheremshanka Airport
Krasnoyarsk - Yemelyanovo Airport 
Moscow - Domodedovo International Airport 
Moscow - Sheremetyevo International Airport
Novosibirsk - Tolmachevo Airport 
Omsk - Omsk Tsentralny Airport
Saint Petersburg - Pulkovo Airport
Tokyo - Narita International Airport 
Tomsk - Bogashevo Airport
Ulan-Ude - Baikal International Airport
Vladivostok - Vladivostok International Airport 
Yakutsk - Yakutsk Airportbase
Yekaterinburg - Koltsovo Airport 
 + several routes in Yakutia Republic

Incidents
26 August 1993, the Let L-410 Turbolet flying from Kutana to Aldan via Uchur, crashed shortly near Aldan Airport, the aircrash was due to the aircraft overload. All the members of crew and all the passengers died. Following the statistics that was the biggest aircrash as for the aircraft overall and as for the republic Yakutia.
13 July 2002, a Sakha Avia An-24RV (RA-46670) landed wheels-up at Yakutsk Airport during a training flight due to crew error; all four crew survived, but the aircraft was written off.

References

Defunct airlines of Russia
Companies based in Sakha Republic
Airlines established in 1992
1992 establishments in Russia
Airlines disestablished in 2002
2002 disestablishments in Russia